Truesdale may refer to:

A place in the United States
 Truesdale, Iowa
 Truesdale, Missouri
 Truesdale Lake, New York

People
 Truesdale (surname), a list of people with the surname

Literary characters
 Truesdale, a fictional character in the 1935 motion picture Shanghai
 Roy Truesdale, protagonist of the second half of Protector, a science fiction novel by Larry Niven
 Syrus Truesdale, a fictional character in the Yu-Gi-Oh! GX anime series
 Will Truesdale, a fictional character in the novel The Piano Teacher by Janice Y. K. Lee
 Zane Truesdale, a fictional character in the Yu-Gi-Oh! GX anime series

Structures
 Truesdale Hospital, was a hospital in Fall River, Massachusetts, United States that was founded by Dr. Philemon E. Truesdale and was merged with Union Hospital. The merged hospital is named Charlton Memorial Hospital, and the name Truesdale is retained in a clinic.